Diane Jean Giebel (born February 19, 1953), also known by her married name Diane Nuess, is an American former competition swimmer.  Giebel represented the United States as a 15-year-old at the 1968 Summer Olympics in Mexico City.  She competed in the women's 200-meter butterfly, and finished sixth overall in the event final with a time of 2:31.7.

After graduating from high school, Giebel attended Glassboro State College (now Rowan University) in Glassboro, New Jersey, where she swam for the Glassboro State Profs in Association for Intercollegiate Athletics for Women (AIAW) competition from 1973 to 1975.  She graduated from Glassboro State with a bachelor's degree in special education in 1975.

See also
 List of Rowan University alumni

References

1953 births
Living people
American female butterfly swimmers
Olympic swimmers of the United States
Rowan University alumni
Sportspeople from Camden, New Jersey
Swimmers at the 1968 Summer Olympics
21st-century American women